Phycothais is a genus of sea snails, marine gastropod mollusks in the subfamily Rapaninae  of the family Muricidae, the murex snails or rock snails.

Species
Species within the genus Phycothais include:

 Phycothais botanica (Hedley, 1918)
 Phycothais reticulata (Quoy & Gaimard, 1833)
 Phycothais texturata (E.A. Smith, 1904)

References

  Claremont M., Vermeij G.J., Williams S.T. & Reid D.G. (2013) Global phylogeny and new classification of the Rapaninae (Gastropoda: Muricidae), dominant molluscan predators on tropical rocky seashores. Molecular Phylogenetics and Evolution 66: 91–102.